Chodda is a genus of moths of the family Erebidae. The genus was erected by Francis Walker in 1863.

Species
 Chodda aeluropis (Meyrick, 1902)
 Chodda costiplaga (Bethune-Baker, 1906)
 Chodda ochreovenata (Bethune-Baker, 1906)
 Chodda sordidula Walker, [1863]

References

Calpinae
Noctuoidea genera